Aboadze is a town in the Western region of Ghana. The serves both as a dormitory town as well as an industrialized zone. It also houses Ghana's first thermal plant for electricity production.

Geography
The town is located 20 kilometres from the centre Takoradi the capital of the Western region. The town is bordered on east by Shama on the west by Inchaban and on the south by Atlantic Ocean.

References

Populated places in the Western Region (Ghana)